Fetal thrombotic vasculopathy is a chronic disorder characterized by thrombosis in the fetus leading to vascular obliteration and hypoperfusion.

It is associated with cerebral palsy and stillbirth.

It is more common in women who have diabetes mellitus.

Diagnosis
It can be diagnosed by histomorphologic examination of the placenta and is characterized by fetal vessel thrombosis and clustered fibrotic chorionic villi without blood vessels.

See also
 Hypertrophic decidual vasculopathy

References

Cerebral palsy and other paralytic syndromes
Health issues in pregnancy